Peter Starling (15 August 1925 – December 1984) was a British gymnast. He competed at the 1952 Summer Olympics and the 1960 Summer Olympics.

References

1925 births
1984 deaths
British male artistic gymnasts
Olympic gymnasts of Great Britain
Gymnasts at the 1952 Summer Olympics
Gymnasts at the 1960 Summer Olympics
Sportspeople from Norwich